Perillaldehyde, perillic aldehyde or perilla aldehyde, is a natural organic compound found most abundantly in the annual herb perilla, but also in a wide variety of other plants and essential oils.  It is a monoterpenoid containing an aldehyde functional group.

Perillaldehyde, or volatile oils from perilla that are rich in perillaldehyde, are used as food additives for flavoring and in perfumery to add spiciness.  Perillaldehyde can be readily converted to perilla alcohol, which is also used in perfumery. It has a mint-like, cinnamon odor and is primarily responsible for the flavor of perilla.

The oxime of perillaldehyde is known as perillartine or perilla sugar and is about 2000 times sweeter than sucrose and is used in Japan as a sweetener. It is presented in lower concentrations in the body odor of persons suffering from Parkinson's disease.

See also 

 Icosane

References

External links

Aldehydes
Food additives
Perfume ingredients
Sugar substitutes
Monoterpenes
Cyclohexenes